The 2004–05 Coppa Italia was the 58th edition of the Italian football tournament. Roma and Internazionale were the finalists. Inter won the tournament by a score of 3–0 aggregate in the final.

Group stage

Group 1

Group 2

Group 3

Group 4

Group 5

Group 6

Group 7

Group 8

Knockout stage

Final

First leg

Second leg 

Internazionale won 3–0 on aggregate.

Top goalscorers

References
rsssf.com

2004-05
Italy
Coppa Italia